Neda Al Hilali (born 1938 Cheb, Czechoslovakia) is an American fiber artist.

Biography
Al Hilali was born in Czechoslovakia and has lived in Baghdad.   She moved to southern California in 1961.  She trained as an artist in Europe, and extensively at the University of California Los Angeles.

Her early works in the 1960s consisted of flat weavings and knotted hangings. These were followed by large, room-filling installations and a series of giant brown-paper "Tongues" installed on Venice beach.

Al Hilali has described her work as "foot tracks of prolonged attention and energy," as each requires many hours of intensive handiwork.

Her work is in the collections of various museums, including the Renwick Gallery, Museum of Arts and Design,  and Utah Museum of Fine Arts. Her papers are at the Archives of American Art.

Exhibitions
1971-72 Deliberate Entanglements: An Exhibition of Fabric Forms, UCLA Art Galleries 
1985 Neda Alhilali: selected works, 1968-1985, Los Angeles Municipal Art Gallery at Barnsdall Park
1985, Fiberworks: an invitational exhibit of contemporary fiberworks, University of Texas at El Paso Department of Art
1985 Artists Select Artists, Modern Master Tapestries.
1986 Legends in fiber, Octagon Center for the Arts, Ames, Iowa
1988 Current works in fiber, Georgia State University Art Gallery

References

External links
Oral history interview with Neda Al-Hilali, 2006 July 18-19, Archives of American Art, Smithsonian Institution
Neda Al-Hilali papers, 1960-1995,  Archives of American Art, Smithsonian Institution
Artworks by Neda Al-Hilali, American Craft Council Library Digital Collections
"Al-Hilali, Neda", Art Inventories Catalog, Smithsonian Institution Research Information System (SIRIS)
Artworks by Neda Al-Hilali at the Washington State Arts Commission

1938 births
Czechoslovak emigrants to the United States
Living people
20th-century women artists
Women textile artists
20th-century American artists
People from Cheb
American textile artists
University of California, Los Angeles alumni